Street Dancer 3D is a 2020 Indian Hindi-language dance film directed by Remo D'Souza and produced by Bhushan Kumar, Divya Khosla Kumar, Krishan Kumar and Lizelle D'Souza under the banners of T-Series and R.D. Entertainment. The film stars Varun Dhawan, Shraddha Kapoor and Prabhu Deva along with Nora Fatehi. The music was composed by Sachin–Jigar, Tanishk Bagchi, Badshah, Guru Randhawa, Gurinder Seagal and Harsh Upadhyay, and released under the banner of T-Series.

Based in London, Street Dancer 3D explores the conflict between an Indian dance team and a rival Pakistani dance team, whose members try to prove themselves as better until they take part in Ground Zero, one of the biggest dance competitions, for different wills; under various circumstances and harsh memories, they come together to win the competition.

Originally planned as a sequel to Disney's ABCD 2 (2015), the film was taken off the title due to Disney's exit from Indian film production, and was instead renamed to its current title after Bhushan Kumar took over as producer. Filming commenced in February 2019 in Punjab, later moved to London and was wrapped up in July 2019. The film was theatrically released in India on 24 January 2020.

Plot

Sahej Singh Narula (Varun Dhawan) becomes the leader of Street Dancer, a London-based Indian hip-hop group, after his brother Inder, the former leader, injures his knee in a dance competition called Ground Zero. Two years after Inder’s injury, Sahej purchases a dance studio, the source of funding for which is hidden. Street Dancer is challenged by the Rule Breakers, a rival Pakistani hip-hop group led by Inayat Naazi (Shraddha Kapoor). Inayat hides her hip-hop lifestyle from her conservative Muslim family. Street Dancer loses to the Rule Breakers because of their overused style. The rival teams watch an India vs Pakistan cricket match at a restaurant owned by Ram Prasad (Prabhu Deva). Rising tensions result in a food fight, that (in order to not be caught by the police) the two main characters pretended they were in love. Sahej asks his girlfriend Nora to coach Street Dancer, as she is a dancer for the Royals, a British dance team that is reigning champion of the Ground Zero competition. Street Dancer and the Rule Breakers watch the India vs Pakistan finals match at Ram’s restaurant. Tensions escalate into a dance battle, which the improved Street Dancer wins. 

After the dance battle, Inayat discovers that Ram feeds leftover food from his restaurant to homeless illegal immigrants. Ram shows Inayat how the homeless of different backgrounds fight together to survive while the privileged dance teams fight against each other over nationality, wasting food in the process. It is revealed that while attending a cousin’s wedding in India, Sahej was pressured to illegally bring a group of dhol players to England, the tipping point being the dhol players’ shady agent Chhabra paying Sahej 4 million rupees, which Sahej used to buy Street Dancer’s studio. Inayat wants the Rule Breakers to win Ground Zero for the 100,000 pound grand prize to pay for the homeless immigrants to get back to their home countries. Sahej wants to win Ground Zero for Inder. Ram states that if Street Dancer and the Rule Breakers were to team up, they would be unstoppable, but the teams refuse. After a dance battle at a club, Sahej and three members of Street Dancer, Sushi, D and Poddy are recruited into the Royals. At Ram’s restaurant, an increasingly arrogant Sahej boasts to the Rule Breakers that he is unbeatable as a Royal. To this, Ram reveals that he is a master of dance and is coaching the Rule Breakers. 

After the first round of Ground Zero, Sahej runs into Amrinder, one of the dhol players he helped bring to England. Amrinder reveals his group was conned by Chhabra and are now struggling as homeless illegal immigrants, unable to return to India. He begs Sahej for help, but Sahej denies responsibility and ditches him. After the Royals’ semi final battle, the team encounters the homeless dhol players on the street and disrespects them. Sahej finally accepts the consequences of his actions and sees how Inayat’s efforts can help the dhol players he wronged. When the Rule Breakers come close to elimination, Sahej succumbs to his guilt and rebels against the Royals. Street Dancer joins the Rule Breakers to advance to the finals against the Royals. Inayat’s conservative family discovers that she is a dancer and forbids her from the competition. However, Sahej convinces them that although Inayat’s hip-hop lifestyle is incompatible with her religious customs, the good she brings to the world through her dancing is godserving and morally righteous. Her father allows her to dance in the finals, and the two teams compete under the name Street Dancer. During Street Dancer's performance, a member of the Royals disconnects their music. Street Dancer must almost forfeit to the Royals, however, the dhol players perform live music. However, Marc finds out that one of his team members took out the music and he asks his teammate to put the music back. Street Dancer wins the competition, earning the respect of the Royals. Using the prize money, they send homeless illegal immigrants, including the dhol players, back home, while Sahej and Inayat begin a relationship.

Cast

Varun Dhawan as Sahej Singh Narula, an aspiring dancer who follows his brother's footsteps. He is the leader of Street Dancer, but after their separation, temporarily becomes a member of the Royals. He joins Rule Breakers afterwards and names the whole team, Street Dancers
Shraddha Kapoor as Inayat Naazi, a Pakistani dancer who dances in secret to avoid her conservative family finding out.
Naufal Azmir Khan as Veer Singh Narula, Sahej's younger brother who was a member of Street Dancer
Prabhu Deva as Ram Prasad a.k.a. Anna, a restaurant manager who secretly is a skilled dancer and also feeds the homeless.
Raghav Juyal as Poddy, Sahej's closest friend and joined rule breakers.
Nora Fatehi as Nora, Sahej's girlfriend and the only Indian member of the Royals prior to Sahej, D, and Sushi joining.
Punit Pathak as Inder Singh Narula, Sahej's brother who was a member of Street Dancer, but injured his knee during a Ground Zero Battle 2 years prior.
Salman Yusuff Khan as Zain Naazi, Inayat's cousin.
Aparshakti Khurana as Amrinder Singh, a talented drummer from India who lives a miserable life as a homeless illegal immigrant in London.
Dharmesh Yelande as D, Sahej's close friend. After a few years of the initial breaking down of Street Dancers upon Inder's injury, he had taken up a job in an antique store.
Sushant Pujari as Sushi, Sahej's close friend.
Sonam Bajwa as Pammi Kaur Chaddha
Murli Sharma as UK Cop Michael Donald, a Pakistani-Indian cop who made sure that Street Dancer and Rule Breakers did not fight at Anna's restaurant. 
Upasana Singh as Jasleen Kaur Chaddha, Pammi's mother
Zarina Wahab as Ranjot Singh, Amrinder's mother
Umair Asanti Khalil as Faris Inayat 
Manoj Pahwa as Chhabra
Pavan Rao as Fahad, a Rule Breaker gang member, who used to hate Sahej, but after he joined them they started being friends.
Vartika Jha as Samaira
Sushant Khatri as Chotu, a waiter at Anna's restaurant who is secretly a dancer, and Anna's assistant with feeding the homeless. He also becomes the second-in-command of the Rule Breakers when Anna takes over.
Keshav KV Tutter as KV
Pravin Bhosle as Pravin
Shyraa Roy as Roxen 
Shashank Dogra as Aamir
Nivedita Sharma as Nivi
Bhusan as Tofique Khan 
Prashant Shinde as Sam
Bhupendra Singh as Omar
Pravin Shinde as Naussef
Sheetal Perry as Perry
Vinay Khandelwal as Faiz
Chandani Shrivastava as Chandani
Francis Roughly as Marc, the leader of the Royals and a ruthless, selfish man.
Caroline Wilde as Alisha
Adriano Gal as Alex
Jai Hickling as Jai
Jesus Soria Antolin as Bboy
Raj Gohil as Zaheer Naazi, Inayat's elder brother, a man who is also conservative, like his younger brother, but allows Inayat to dance at the Ground Zero finals.

Production
The first schedule of the film was shot in Punjab with Dhawan, Bajwa and Khurana. Later, the second schedule took place in London with the rest of the team including Kapoor and Fatehi. Katrina Kaif was original choice for lead role, but she opted out, and much later, Kapoor joined the cast. During the May schedule of shooting, she suffered a muscle spasm. The film was wrapped up on 26 July 2019.

Marketing and release
A first look poster of Dhawan in the film was unveiled on 27 May, with the release date. In the poster, it was shown that film to be released on 24 January 2020.

Soundtrack 

The film's music was composed by Sachin–Jigar, Tanishk Bagchi, Badshah, Guru Randhawa, Gurinder Seagal and Harsh Upadhyay while lyrics written by Kumaar, Priya Saraiya, Guru Randhawa, Badshah, Jigar Saraiya, Tanishk Bagchi, Vayu, IP Singh, Bhargav Purohit, Kunaal Vermaa, Garry Sandhu, Shabbir Ahmed, Sameer Anjaan, Millind Gaba and Asli Gold.

The song "Muqabla" from the Tamil film Kadhalan, which was dubbed in Hindi as Humse Hai Muqabla, was originally composed by A. R. Rahman, lyrics by Vaali in Tamil and P.K. Mishra in Hindi and sung by Mano and Swarnalatha, and then was recreated by Tanishk Bagchi. A version of the song was initially used to promote ABCD: Any Body Can Dance.

The third song "Illegal Weapon 2.0" is a remake of the Punjabi single "Illegal Weapon" featuring Jasmine Sandlas and Garry Sandhu, which was recreated by Bagchi.

The fifth song Lagdi Lahore Di is a remake of Guru Randhawa's most viewed song "Lahore", recreated by Randhawa himself in collaboration with Sachin–Jigar.

The sixth song "Hindustani" is a remake of the song "Suno Gaur Se Duniya Walo" originally composed by Shankar–Ehsaan–Loy, lyrics by Sameer Anjaan and sung by Shankar Mahadevan, Udit Narayan, Mahalakshmi Iyer, Domnique, and recreated by Harsh Upadhyay.

The seventh song Bezubaan Kab Se is a remake of the song "Bezubaan" from ABCD: Any Body Can Dance, which was held by UTV Music. After the purchase of the rights, lyrics of the remake were written by Jigar Saraiya, one-half of composer duo Sachin–Jigar, who also composed the original, which had lyrics by Mayur Puri.
 
The eleventh song Sip Sip 2.0, a promotional song, is a remake of the Punjabi single "Sip Sip", which was recreated by Bagchi.
 
The final song, Mile Sur, is a rehash of the popular song of the same name promoting national integration in India and broadcast regularly on National Feast Days, and originally composed by Ashok Patki with Piyush Pandey writing the original Hindi lyrics. Composed by Sachin–Jigar, the rehash version had lyrics written by Saraiya in collaboration with Vayu and IP Singh.

Box office
Street Dancer 3D earned 10.26 crore at the domestic box office on its opening day. On the second day, the film collected 13.21 crore. On the third day, the film collected 17.76 crore, taking total opening weekend collection to 41.23 crore.

, with a gross of 86.29 crore in India and 15.71 crore overseas, the film has a worldwide gross collection of 102 crore.

References

External links
 
 Street Dancer 3D on Bollywood Hungama
 

Films shot in Punjab, India
Films shot in London
2020s Hindi-language films
Films scored by Guru Randhawa
Films scored by Badshah
Films scored by Sachin–Jigar
Films scored by Tanishk Bagchi
Indian dance films
Indian coming-of-age films
T-Series (company) films
Films about immigration to Europe
India–Pakistan relations in popular culture
Films about dance competitions
Films set in London
2020s coming-of-age films
Films directed by Remo D'Souza
2020s dance films